Gus Morrison (born ?) is an American politician and engineer. Morrison has served as the Mayor of Fremont, California, for three different tenures: 1985 to 1989, 1994 to 2004, and 2012. On January 30, 2012, Morrison was appointed Mayor by the Fremont City Council following the death of his predecessor, the late Bob Wasserman, effective immediately. He was inaugurated into office to complete the remainder of Wasserman's unexpired term (ending in December 2012) on January 31, 2012.

Morrison was first elected to the Fremont City Council in 1978. He ran for Fremont mayor in 1980, losing to Leon Mezzetti. He defeated Mezzetti in a rematch in 1985, serving for two electoral cycles before being defeated by Bill Ball in 1989, narrowly losing with 10,436 votes to Ball's 10,868 votes. In 1994, Morrison defeated incumbent Mayor Bill Ball in a rematch of the 1989 mayoral election. Morrison narrowly won with 20,811 votes to Ball's 20,376 votes.

Between 2004 and 2012, Morrison worked as a political consultant.

References

External links

Fremont Chronology of Elections

Year of birth missing (living people)
Mayors of places in California
People from Fremont, California
California city council members
San Jose State University alumni
Politicians from Buffalo, New York
Living people